Cound Halt was an unstaffed railway station on the Severn Valley line in Shropshire, England. It opened on 4 August 1934 and although thought by some people to have been closed as part of the Beeching axe in 1963 its planned closure pre-dated his report. The site of the station is now occupied by the beer garden of the adjacent Riverside Inn pub.

References

Further reading

Beeching closures in England
Disused railway stations in Shropshire
Former Great Western Railway stations
Railway stations in Great Britain opened in 1934
Railway stations in Great Britain closed in 1963